St. Mark's Episcopal Church in Groveton, Virginia is an Episcopal church that was established in 1880 as Groveton Mission.  It is one of several churches established by students of the Virginia Theological Seminary in Alexandria.

It has also been known as the Christ Episcopal Protestant Church of Groveton and Groveton Episcopal Chapel.

Its current building was built in 1958.

A historical marker was placed at the church in 2011 by the Fairfax County History Commission.

References

External links
St. Mark's Episcopal Church, official site

Historic sites in Virginia
Episcopal churches in Virginia
Churches in Fairfax County, Virginia
Churches completed in 1958
Religious organizations established in 1880
1880 establishments in Virginia